Jack Ashton is a British actor, best known for playing Rev. Tom Hereward in the BBC television series, Call the Midwife.

Ashton is in a relationship with his on-screen co-star Helen George. In September 2017, their daughter Wren Ivy was born. The couple's second daughter Lark, was born in November 2021.

References

External links

British male film actors
British male television actors
Living people
Year of birth missing (living people)
21st-century British male actors